Semium is a genus of plant bugs in the family Miridae. There are about seven described species in Semium.

Species
These seven species belong to the genus Semium:
 Semium brailovskyi Schuh, 2017
 Semium guatemalanus Carvalho, 1976
 Semium hirtum Reuter, 1876
 Semium rubronotum Kelton, 1959
 Semium subglaber Knight & Slater, 1927
 Semium subglabrum Knight, 1927
 Semium villosum Kelton, 1973

References

Further reading

 
 
 

Phylinae
Articles created by Qbugbot